No Fixed Address (NFA) are an Australian reggae rock group whose members are all Aboriginal Australians, mostly from South Australia. The band formed in 1979, split in 1984, with several brief reformations or guest appearances in 1987–1988 and 2008, before reuniting in 2016 and performing several times since then.

They have been inducted into the Hall of Fame at the inaugural National Indigenous Music Awards as well as the SA Music Hall of Fame, and have had a laneway in Adelaide CBD named after them.

Biography

1979–1984

No Fixed Address formed in 1979 at the Centre for Aboriginal Studies in Music (CASM) in North Adelaide, South Australia. Most of the band members were students at CASM, where they first heard reggae music from Jamaica, including Bob Marley, Peter Tosh and Jimmy Cliff.

The all-Aboriginal band was led by Pitjanjatjara man Bart Willoughby (lead vocals and drums), from Koonibba Mission near Ceduna in the far south-west of South Australia, and included Kurnai man Ricky Harrison (rhythm guitarist and principal songwriter) from Morwell in Victoria; Ngarrindjeri man Leslie Lovegrove Freeman (lead guitarist) from Murray Bridge in South Australia; John Miller (bass) from Port Lincoln in South Australia; and Ngarrindjeri woman Veronica Rankine (tenor saxophone), from the south-east of South Australia.  Many members were related through family ties; Willoughby, Miller and Freeman were cousins. Freeman, related to Harrison through marriage, recruited him from Victoria.

In 1979, NFA played its first large concert at the National Aboriginal Day held at Taperoo, South Australia, and were especially supported by community radio station 5MMM after this. Four of their songs made the Top 5 playlist on Three D Radio (then 5MMM). The band became a very popular pub rock outfit among students and the alternative music scene.

In 1980 the band made a feature film titled Wrong Side of the Road with another CASM band, Us Mob. The movie dealt with the trials and joys of touring and the contrasting receptions they received in Indigenous and non-Indigenous communities. With the recording of the soundtrack, No Fixed Address and Us Mob became the first contemporary Aboriginal bands to be recorded. The film won the Jury Prize for best picture at the 1981 AFI Awards.

On the strength of their live performances and airplay of their demo recordings on 5MMM they were the cover story on the August 1980 edition of national rock magazine Roadrunner. In late 1980, the band supported Cold Chisel on its "Summer Offensive" tour to the east coast, with the final concert on 20 December at the University of Adelaide.

In 1982 the band were contracted to Rough Diamond Records, a subsidiary of Polygram Records and released their debut mini-album From My Eyes. The album was launched at the Hilton Hotel by the Australian Prime Minister, Bob Hawke. The video for the single, "From My Eyes" was filmed at Hanging Rock in Victoria and the Old Melbourne Gaol. The band toured Australia in 1982, in support of Peter Tosh. Following the success of the Peter Tosh tour, the band became the first Aboriginal band to travel overseas, touring Great Britain, playing at nine cities including London, Bristol, Leeds, Plymouth and Manchester.

Didgeridoo player Billy Inda made a guest appearance and Joe Geia played the introduction didgeridoo on folk rock band Goanna's single "Solid Rock" from their 1982 album, Spirit of Place. The single peaked at No. 3 in October on the Kent Music Report Singles Chart, the first charting rock song to feature the didgeridoo.

The 1984 video for "We Have Survived" was filmed at Palm Beach and Botany Bay in Sydney.  The song has become an unofficial anthem for many of Australia's Indigenous peoples, with its most well-known line "We have survived /The White man’s world /And you know /You can’t change that".

NFA also toured with The Clash, Ian Dury and the Blockheads, Midnight Oil, Split Enz, Mental as Anything and others.

Willoughby joined his cousin (Bunna Lawrie)'s band, Coloured Stone in 1984.

1987–1988

In 1987 Willoughby reformed the band and they toured Europe, including a number of Eastern Bloc countries, appearing at the East Berlin Festival. In late 1988 Willoughby joined Yothu Yindi and as result the group disbanded again.

2008

In 2008 the band reformed and played at the Dreaming Festival in Woodford, Queensland, and the Tarerer Festival in Port Fairy, Victoria, where they released a limited edition CD copy of From My Eyes. Also in 2008 the band's song "We Have Survived" was added to the National Film and Sound Archive's Sounds of Australia registry.

2016–present

In June 2016 the band reunited to perform in Adelaide when they were inducted into the SA Music Hall of Fame. On 29 September 2016 the band performed at the Lomond Hotel in Brunswick East, Melbourne.

The band performed on Australia Day at the Share the Spirit Festival in the Treasury Gardens, Melbourne, in both 2017 and 2020. They also performed at the Saltwater Festival in Broome, Western Australia, in 2018.

On 25 March 2021 they performed at The Gov in Adelaide to celebrate the naming of "No Fixed Address Lane" in the city (see below).

Members

Various band members have included:
 Bart Willoughby – drums, vocals, guitar, didgeridoo (1979–1985, 1987–1988, 2008–current)
 Selwyn Burns – guitar 
 Joe Geia – vocals, percussion, didgeridoo (1982–1983)
 Les Graham – guitar (1979–1983)
 Ricky Harrison – guitar (1979–1985 2008-current)
 Joe Hayes – bass (1982)
 Billy Inda – percussion, didgeridoo (1982)
 Chris Jones – guitar (1982–1985)
 Les Lovegrove – guitar (1987–1988, 2008-current)
 Rick Lovegrove – guitar (1987–1988,)
 Louis McManus – guitar (1984–1985)
 John 'John' Miller – bass (1979–1985, 1987–1988, 2008-current)
 Nicky Moffatt – bass (1983–1985)
 Veronica Rankine – vocals, saxophone, flute (1979–1985)
 Peter Meredith – guitar (1983–1984)
 Billy Gorham – bass (1982 -1983)
 Donald 'Ducky' Taylor (1982-1983)

Discography

Albums

Singles

Awards and recognition

 "We Have Survived" was added to the National Film and Sound Archive's Sounds of Australia registry in 2008.
 In 2020, Lindes Lane (a street abutting Adelaide's Rundle Mall) was renamed "No Fixed Address Lane", in honour of the band.

National Indigenous Music Awards
The National Indigenous Music Awards (NIMA) (formally NT Indigenous Music Awards) recognise excellence, dedication, innovation and outstanding contribution to the Northern Territory music industry. They commenced in 2004.

! 
|-
! scope="row" rowspan="1"| 2011
| No Fixed Address 
| Hall of Fame
| 
| 
|-

South Australian Music Awards
The South Australian Music Awards, also known as SA Music Awards, commonly SAM Awards, formerly Fowler's Live Music Awards (FLMA), are annual awards that exist to recognise, promote and celebrate excellence in the South Australian contemporary music industry. They commenced in 2012.

! 
|-
! scope="row" rowspan="1"| 2016
| No Fixed Address 
| South Australian Music Hall of Fame
| 
| 
|-

References

External links
AFI Screen Biographies

Indigenous Australian musical groups
Musical groups from Adelaide
Musical groups established in 1979
Reggae rock groups